Look for the Black Star is the debut album by American jazz saxophonist Dewey Redman featuring performances recorded in 1966 and originally released on the Dutch Fontana label but later released in the U.S. on the Freedom label in 1975.

Reception
The Allmusic review by Scott Yanow awarded the album 4 stars stating "This early recording finds Redman discovering his own individual voice on five of his frequently emotional originals... this San Francisco date is quite adventurous and holds one's interest throughout".

Track listing
All compositions by Dewey Redman
 "Look for the Black Star" - 15:41   
 "For Eldon" - 6:29   
 "Spur of the Moment" - 1:54   
 "Seven and One" - 13:22   
 "Of Love" - 7:58
Recorded in San Francisco on January 4, 1966

Personnel
Dewey Redman - tenor saxophone
Jim Young (also known as Jymm or Joachim Young)- piano
Donald Garrett - bass, clarinet
Eddie Moore - drums

References

Fontana Records albums
Freedom Records albums
Dewey Redman albums
1966 debut albums